Esther Kurabi (born 31 March 1991) is a Papua New Guinean former footballer. She has been a member of the Papua New Guinea women's national team.

Club career
Kurabi has captained Guria in Papua New Guinea.

International career
Kurabi capped for Papua New Guinea at senior level during the 2010 OFC Women's Championship.

References

1991 births
Living people
Papua New Guinean women's footballers
Papua New Guinea women's international footballers
Women's association footballers not categorized by position